Elijah Baldwin was a state legislator during the Reconstruction era in Alabama. He represented Wilcox County, Alabama in the Alabama House of Representatives. He also served as a constable in Wilcox County.

He was a leader at the Antioch Baptist Church in Camden, Alabama.

He and other state legislators who were African American and served during the Reconstruction era in Alabama are listed on a historical marker commemorating their service.

See also
African-American officeholders during and following the Reconstruction era

References

People from Camden, Alabama
19th-century American politicians
African-American politicians during the Reconstruction Era
Members of the Alabama House of Representatives
Baptists from Alabama
Year of birth missing
Year of death missing